The 2021 Ceratizit Challenge by La Vuelta was a women's road cycling stage race that was held in the region of Galicia in northwestern Spain from 2 to 5 September 2021. It was the seventh edition of the Ceratizit Challenge by La Vuelta and was the fifteenth event on the 2021 UCI Women's World Tour calendar.

Teams 
All nine UCI Women's WorldTeams and fifteen UCI Women's Continental Teams made up the twenty-four teams that participated in the race. In total, 137 riders started the race, of which 111 finished.

UCI Women's WorldTeams

 
 
 
 
 
 
 
 
 

UCI Women's Continental Teams

Route 
The 2021 edition increased the number of stages to 4, with the race finishing in Santiago de Compostela. As usual, the final stage took place in conjunction with the final stage of the 2021 Vuelta a España.

Stages

Stage 1 
2 September 2021 — Estación de Montaña de Manzaneda to A Rúa,

Stage 2 
3 September 2021 — Estación de Montaña de Manzaneda,  (ITT)

Stage 3 
4 September 2021 — Estación de Montaña de Manzaneda to O Pereiro de Aguiar,

Stage 4 
5 September 2021 — As Pontes to Santiago de Compostela,

Classification leadership table 

 On stages 2 and 3, Coryn Rivera, who was second in the points classification, wore the green jersey, because first-placed Marlen Reusser wore the red jersey as the leader of the general classification.

Current classification standings

General classification

Points classification

Team classification

See also 
 2021 in women's road cycling

References

External links 
 

2021 UCI Women's World Tour
2021
2021 in Spanish sport
September 2021 sports events in Spain